Biomaterials Science is a peer-reviewed scientific journal that explores the underlying science behind the function, interactions and design of biomaterials. It is published by the Royal Society of Chemistry. The current editor-in-chief is Jianjun Cheng (Westlake University, China), while the executive editor is Maria Southall.

The journal was established in 2013 and since January 2018 has been the official journal of the European Society for Biomaterials. Since the start of 2016 the journal has been online only. It publishes primary research (Communications and full paper articles) and review-type articles (reviews and minireviews).

Abstracting and indexing 

The journal is abstracted and indexed in:
 Science Citation Index
 Index Medicus/MEDLINE/PubMed
 Scopus

See also 
 List of scientific journals in chemistry
 Journal of Materials Chemistry B
 MedChemComm

References

External links 
 

Materials science journals
Royal Society of Chemistry academic journals
Biochemistry journals
Publications established in 2013
Monthly journals
English-language journals